This list of current cities, towns, unincorporated communities, and other recognized places in the U.S. state of Arkansas whose name begins with the letter V. It also includes information on the number and names of counties in which the place lies, and its lower and upper zip code bounds, if applicable.

Cities and Towns

Townships

Places: V